Nosaltres, els valencians ("We, the Valencians"), is a historical and political essay by the Valencian (Spain) author Joan Fuster, first published in 1962.

The book deals with Valencians, especially their national identity and their relationship with Spain, Catalonia and the Catalan-speaking community as a whole. It does so from an ardourous Catalanism.

The fact that it represented the first solid intellectual effort in the twentieth century to construct an overview of the past and the present of Valencians from a Catalanist point of view explains its relevance and controversy back in the day.
It was because of the novelty of this new Catalanist paradigm, consisting of Catalanism made from Valencia, that the book caused a stir in the Valencian Francoist establishment and, with the advent of democracy in Spain, still remained deeply controversial for its uncompromising views.

Nosaltres, els valencians marked the dawn of Valencian nationalism in its modern formulation. It was also the main force behind a revival of the Països Catalans idea and, with it, of the blaverist reaction against it as well.

Criticism
The book was criticized by some Valencian nationalists as well, who considered that Fuster took the Catalan nationalist model without adjusting it to the reality of what soon after (1982) became the present Valencian Community with the passing of the Valencian Statute of Autonomy.

Influence
The book remained most influential in the Valencian Community during the 1980s. It began losing relevance by the early 1990s, as the Unitat del Poble Valencià, a party which had been partially inspired by it, started shifting their doctrine from Catalanism to Valencianism-proper, still within the Catalanist tenet, though. To date, Nosaltres els Valencians remains a fundamental cornerstone of the literature on Valencian identity, as much despised by some —who see in it a Catalanist fifth column in Valencia— as revered by others —who regard it as a yet to be surpassed reflection on the Valencian identity.

Sources and influences

Fuster was influenced by Jaume Vicens i Vives's 1954 essay Notícia de Catalunya. Notícia de Catalunya was to initially be titled Nosaltres els catalans, but it was renamed under Josep Pla's advice, for fear of Francoist censorship. Fuster's work has the same structure and intention of Vicens'.

See also 
 Països Catalans

References

Further reading
Fuster, Joan: Obres Completes. Barcelona, Edicions 62, 2002. 
Fuster, Joan: Antologia de la poesia valenciana : (1900-1950). Valencia, Eliseu Climent Ed., 1994.  
Fuster, Joan: L'Albufera de València. Alzira, Edicions Bromera, 1993. 
Fuster, Joan: Elogi del meu poble : Sueca, a la ribera del Xúquer. Catarroja, Editorial Afers, 1997. 
Iborra, Josep: Fuster portàtil. Valencia, Tres i Quatre, 1982. 
Iborra, Josep: Breviari Cívic. Barcelona, Edicions 62, 1996. 
The book itself:

External links
 Nosaltres els valencians. The downloadable book (PDF) 
 Biblioteca Joan Fuster, Universidad Jaime I, Castellón de la Plana 
 Biblioteca Municipal de Godella, on Joan Fuster 

Catalan-language literature
Essay collections
1962 documents